Variable skink may denote either of two different skinks:

 Eumeces multivirgatus epipleurotus, the southern subspecies of the many-lined skink from North America
 Trachylepis laevigata, a variable mabuya from Africa
 Trachylepis varia, a variable mabuya from Africa

Animal common name disambiguation pages